William Berton was an English medieval college Fellow and university Chancellor.

Life
Berton was a Fellow of Merton College, Oxford and twice Chancellor of the University of Oxford during 1379–81 and 1382. He was a Doctor of Divinity. The controversy surrounding the theologian John Wycliffe concerning the sacrament was current at the time of Berton's Chancellorship and he gave some credence to Wycliffe's argument.

References

Year of birth unknown
Year of death unknown
14th-century English Roman Catholic priests
Fellows of Merton College, Oxford
Chancellors of the University of Oxford